John Clerke (by 1525 – 1554 or later), of Wookey, Somerset, was an English politician.

Family
Clerke was the son of Thomas Clerke, who was MP for Wells in the same year that John  represented nearby Bath.

Career
He was a Member (MP) of the Parliament of England for Bath in 1547.

References

Year of death missing
English MPs 1547–1552
Politicians from Somerset
Year of birth uncertain